Michael Eugene Dominic Jarrett  (born 18 September 1972) is an English medical doctor and former first-class cricketer.

Jarrett was born at Lambeth in September 1972. He was educated at Harrow School, before going up to Girton College, Cambridge, where he studied medicine. While studying at Cambridge, he played first-class cricket for Cambridge University, making his debut against Leicestershire at Fenner's in 1992. He played first-class cricket for Cambridge until 1993, making a total of seventeen appearances. He scored 383 runs in his seventeen matches for Cambridge, at an average of 16.65 and a high score of 51. After Cambridge, Jarrett undertook further studies in medicine at Worcester College at the University of Oxford. He played further first-class matches for Oxford University in 1995 and 1996, making fourteen appearances. He scored 219 runs in these matches, at an average of 19.90 and a high score of 50 not out. While playing for Oxford, Jarrett also undertook wicket-keeping duties, taking 12 catches and making a single stumping.

A fellow of the Fellowship of the Royal Colleges of Surgeons, Jarrett became a colorectal surgeon.

References

External links

1972 births
Living people
People from Lambeth
People educated at Harrow School
Alumni of Girton College, Cambridge
English cricketers
Cambridge University cricketers
Alumni of Worcester College, Oxford
Oxford University cricketers
20th-century English medical doctors
Fellows of the Royal College of Surgeons
21st-century English medical doctors